Mayberry is an unincorporated community in Pawnee County, Nebraska, in the United States.

History
A post office was established at Mayberry in 1884, and remained in operation until it was discontinued in 1934. The community was named for Charles N. Mayberry, a pioneer settler.

References

Unincorporated communities in Pawnee County, Nebraska
Unincorporated communities in Nebraska